The World Amateur Bodybuilding Championships is an annual event held in cities around the world. This event, formerly known as IFBB Mr. Universe, is a male bodybuilding contest organised by the International Federation of BodyBuilding & Fitness (IFBB) and first held in 1959.  The name was changed in 1976 to avoid confusion with the NABBA Mr. Universe.

Men

- 60 kg

- 65 kg

- 70 kg

- 75 kg

Totals

References

Lists of bodybuilders
World Amateur Bodybuilding Championships